Joan Sylvia Lyttle Birman (born May 30, 1927, in New York City) is an American mathematician, specializing in low-dimensional topology. She has made contributions to the study of knots, 3-manifolds, mapping class groups of surfaces, geometric group theory, contact structures and dynamical systems. Birman is research professor emerita at Barnard College, Columbia University, where she has been since 1973.

Family 
Her parents were George and Lillian Lyttle, both Jewish immigrants. Her father was from Russia but grew up in Liverpool, England. Her mother was born in New York and her parents were Russian-Polish immigrants. At age 17, George emigrated to the US and became a successful dress manufacturer. He appreciated the opportunities from having a business but he wanted his daughters to focus on education. She has three children, Kenneth P. Birman, Deborah Birman Shlider, and Carl David Birman. Her late husband, Joseph Birman, was a physicist and a leading advocate for human rights for scientists.

Education
After high school, Birman entered Swarthmore College, a coeducational institution in Swarthmore, Pennsylvania, and majored in mathematics. However, she disliked living in the dorms so she transferred to Barnard College, a women's only college affiliated to Columbia University, to live at home.

Birman received her B.A. (1948) in mathematics from Barnard College and an M.A. (1950) in physics from Columbia University.
After working in the industry from 1950 to 1960, she did a PhD in mathematics at the Courant Institute (NYU) under the supervision of Wilhelm Magnus, graduating in 1968. Her dissertation was titled Braid groups and their relationship to mapping class groups.

Career
After she earned her bachelor's degree from Barnard, Birman accepted a position at the Polytechnic Research and Development Co., which was affiliated with Brooklyn Polytechnic University. She later worked from the Technical Research Group and the W. L. Maxson Corporation.

Birman's first academic position was at the Stevens Institute of Technology (1968–1973). When she joined, she was the only female professor out of 160.  In 1969 she published "On Braid Groups", which introduced a mapping class group of a surface called the Birman Exact Sequence, which became one of the most important tools in the study of braids and surfaces. During the later part of this period she published a monograph, 'Braids, links, and mapping class groups' based on a graduate course she taught as a visiting professor at Princeton University in 1971–72. This book is considered the first comprehensive treatment of braid theory, introducing the modern theory to the field, and contains the first complete proof of the Markov theorem on braids.

In 1973, she joined the faculty at Barnard College, where she served as Chairman of the Mathematics Department from 1973-87, 1989-1991, and 1995-1998. She was a visiting scholar at the Institute for Advanced Study in the summer of 1988.

She supervised 21 doctoral students, and has a total of 50 academic descendants. Her doctoral students include Józef Przytycki.

Birman was a founding editor of the journals Geometry and Topology and Algebraic and Geometric Topology.

Birman was a co-founder of Mathematical Sciences Publishing, a non-profit publishing house. She was a member of the New York Academy of Sciences Human Rights of Scientists Committee.

in 1990, Birman donated funds to the American Mathematical Society to establish the Ruth Lyttle Satter Prize in Mathematics in honor of her sister, Ruth Lyttle Satter, who was a plant physiologist.

In 2017, she endowed the Joan and Joseph Birman Fellowship for Women Scholars at the American Mathematical Society to support mathematical research by mid-career women.

Work 
According to her MathSciNet author profile, Birman's scientific work includes 106 research publications and over 300 published reviews in Math Reviews. She is the author of the research monograph Braids, Links, and Mapping Class Groups.

Recognition
In 1974, Birman was selected as a Sloan Research Fellow by the Alfred P. Sloan Foundation. 
In 1987, she was selected by the Association for Women in Mathematics to be a Noether Lecturer; this lecture honors women who have made fundamental and sustained contributions to the mathematical sciences. 
In 1994, she was selected as a Guggenheim Foundation Fellow by the John Simon Guggenheim Memorial Foundation. In 1996, the Mathematical Association of America awarded Birman the Chauvenet Prize, "the highest award for mathematical expository writing" for her 1993 essay New Points of View in Knot Theory.

In 2003, Birman was elected to the European Academy of Sciences. In 2005, she won the New York City Mayor's Award for Excellence in Science and Technology.

Birman received an honorary doctorate from the Technion Israel Institute of Technology.

In 2012, Birman was elected to the American Academy of Arts and Sciences
In 2013, she became a fellow of the American Mathematical Society in the inaugural class.

In 2013 the Association for Women in Mathematics established the Joan & Joseph Birman Research Prize in Topology and Geometry, first awarded in 2015.

In 2015, Birman was named an honorary member of the London Mathematical Society.

The Association for Women in Mathematics included her in the 2020 class of AWM Fellows for "her groundbreaking research connecting diverse fields, and for her award-winning expository writing; for continuously supporting women in mathematics as an active mentor and a research role model; and for sponsoring multiple prize initiatives for women".

In 2021, Birman was elected to the National Academy of Sciences.

She is included in a deck of playing cards featuring notable women mathematicians published by the Association of Women in Mathematics.

Selected publications

See also
 Birman–Wenzl algebra

References

External links 
 
 
 Profiles of Women in Mathematics, The Emmy Noether Lectures, Presented by the Association for Women in Mathematics, "Joan S. Birman: Studying Links via Braids" Archived by the Wayback Machine
 Joan S. Birman's author profile on MathSciNet

1927 births
Living people
20th-century American mathematicians
21st-century American mathematicians
American women mathematicians
20th-century American Jews
Courant Institute of Mathematical Sciences alumni
Barnard College alumni
Columbia Graduate School of Arts and Sciences alumni
Columbia University faculty
Topologists
Stevens Institute of Technology faculty
Institute for Advanced Study visiting scholars
Fellows of the American Academy of Arts and Sciences
Fellows of the American Mathematical Society
Fellows of the Association for Women in Mathematics
Mathematicians from New York (state)
20th-century women mathematicians
21st-century women mathematicians
20th-century American women
Members of the United States National Academy of Sciences
21st-century American women
21st-century American Jews